Dirty Pair: Project Eden, known in Japan as , is a 1986 Japanese science fiction action anime film directed by Kōichi Mashimo and animated by Nippon Sunrise. The film is based on the Dirty Pair anime series, and follows protagonists Kei and Yuri as they investigate mysterious activities on the planet Agerna. The film was originally released in Japan on November 28, 1986, and was later licensed for release in North America in 1994 by Streamline Pictures. It was later redubbed and released on DVD on November 9, 2003 by ADV Films. The Streamline version was directed by Carl Macek.

Plot
After stopping a group of Vizorium smugglers, Kei and Yuri, the Lovely Angels (more commonly known as the Dirty Pair), are sent on a mission to Agerna, a planet rich with Vizorium, a mineral necessary for space travel. They are sent to stop the mysterious attacks on mining operations that have the governments of the world pointing fingers and blaming each other. While the pair bathe, Carson D. Carson, a former member of the group of smugglers they stopped on their last mission, interrupts their baths by falling through a vent. While Kei and Yuri get out of the bathtubs and question Carson, they are attacked by strange alien monsters that force the Angels to flee, leaving their equipment behind and wearing nothing but towels.

The Lovely Angels are forced to ally with Carson to stop Dr. Wattsman, a mad scientist bent on taking a long dormant alien race, the Sadinga, to its final evolutionary form. After they are captured by Dr. Wattsman, it is revealed that Carson was really trying to obtain a rare World War II-vintage wine. Carson D. Carson is forced to fight Bruno, Dr. Wattman's servant. Kei witnesses the fight and initially believes that Carson is killed by Bruno, but later discovers he survived. Kei, Yuri, and Carson take Wattsman and Bruno into custody. However, Carson accidentally activates Wattsman's equipment and Sadingas all over the planet are awakened and cause chaos.

Voice cast

Reception
The film has received positive reviews, with some critics considering it to be superior to the Dirty Pair anime television series. Mike Crandol of Anime News Network states that "Dirty Pair: Project Eden is one of the few glorious exceptions ... it's not just bigger and louder, it actually is better. Rarely do all the elements come together so nicely, and even all these years later it's hard to think of any other anime that's simply as much fun as this movie". Rebecca Silverman of Anime News Network mentions on her review of the Dirty Pair Features Collection that among the three films this one was the "campiest with the least urgent storyline". She also states that the animation "has moments of beautiful fluidity, such as Yuri flopping in a tub of water, the dissolution of a floor beneath the characters' feet, or Yuri's impromptu dance number on a transport." Helen McCarthy in 500 Essential Anime Movies commented that the film can "stand the test of time" and that "this is a movie with lots to enjoy. Even the cheesy '80s pop soundtrack has its own guilty charm".

Music
 Opening Theme:
 "Safari Eyes" by Miki Matsubara
 Insert song:
 "Over the Top" by Miki Matsubara
 Ending Theme:
 "pas de deux" by Miki Matsubara

Notes

External links
 

1980s female buddy films
1980s science fiction films
1986 anime films
Action anime and manga
Animated films based on animated series
ADV Films
Dirty Pair
Films set in the 22nd century
Girls with guns anime and manga
Japanese science fiction films
Science fiction anime and manga
Sunrise (company)